Wog Wog is a locality in the Queanbeyan–Palerang Regional Council, New South Wales, Australia.

Wog Wog or wogwog or variation, may also refer to:

 Wog Wog River, New South Wales, Australia
 Wog Wog Mountain, Budawang Range, New South Wales, Australia

Other uses
 Paralampona wogwog (P. wogwog), a species of spider

See also

 WOG (disambiguation)